Nouchka Fontijn (born 9 November 1987) is a retired Dutch boxer. She is the current European champion in the women's middleweight or 75 kg class after winning gold at both the European Games in 2015 and the European Championships in 2014.

Early life and education
Nouchka Fontijn was born on 9 November 1987 in Rotterdam in the Netherlands. She studied physiotherapy at the Rotterdam University of Applied Sciences.

Boxing career

Fontijn started amateur boxing in 2007 and has been competing in the middleweight or 75 kg class. She first became Dutch champion in 2009 and has prolonged her title every year since.

She won silver at the 2011 European Championships in Rotterdam, after losing in the final from Nadezhda Torlopova. She won gold at the 2014 European Championships in Bucharest. The next year, she also won gold at the 2015 European Games in Baku.

She won silver at the 2016 World Championships in Astana and again silver at the 2016 Summer Olympics in Rio de Janeiro, both times after losing 3–0 to Claressa Shields in the final.

Fontijn also competed at the 2020 Summer Olympics in Tokyo where she won the bronze medal.

References

External links

1987 births
AIBA Women's World Boxing Championships medalists
Boxers at the 2015 European Games
Boxers at the 2016 Summer Olympics
Boxers at the 2020 Summer Olympics
Dutch women boxers
Living people
Medalists at the 2016 Summer Olympics
Medalists at the 2020 Summer Olympics
Olympic boxers of the Netherlands
Olympic medalists in boxing
Olympic silver medalists for the Netherlands
Olympic bronze medalists for the Netherlands
Boxers from Rotterdam
European Games medalists in boxing
European Games gold medalists for the Netherlands
Boxers at the 2019 European Games
European Games silver medalists for the Netherlands
Middleweight boxers